Mark Montgomery may refer to:

 Mark Montgomery (entrepreneur) (born 1967), American entrepreneur
 Mark Montgomery (basketball) (born 1970), American college basketball coach
 Mark Montgomery (baseball) (born 1990), minor league baseball pitcher
 Mark Montgomery (softball) (born 1966), American college softball coach
 Mark Montgomery (wrestler) (born 1974), Northern Irish sportsman
 Mark Montgomery (racing driver) in 2005 NASCAR Busch Series

See also
Marc Montgomery (disambiguation)